Parmotrema abnuens is a species of corticolous lichen in the family Parmeliaceae. It was first introduced to science in 1885 as a species of Parmelia by William Nylander in 1885, who described the lichen from samples collected in Uruguay. Mason Hale transferred it to the genus Parmotrema in 1974. The species has also been recorded from Brazil and India.

See also
List of Parmotrema species

References

abnuens
Lichen species
Lichens described in 1885
Lichens of India
Lichens of Brazil
Lichens of Uruguay
Taxa named by William Nylander (botanist)